Three Men and a Cradle is a 1985 French comedy film by Coline Serreau. The film was remade in Hollywood as Three Men and a Baby in 1987 which was subsequently remade into seven movies in six languages.

Plot
Three young men (Jacques, Pierre and Michel) share an apartment in Paris having many girlfriends and parties; during the film, they have signed a contract never to allow a girl to spend more than one night at their place. During one party, a friend of Jacques' tells him he has a compromising package (which turned out to be heroin) to deliver, and asks Jacques if he can leave it discreetly at their place. Jacques agrees and, as he works as a steward, flies away for a one-month trip in Japan telling Pierre and Michel about the package. One of Jacques' former girlfriends drops a baby before their door, making Pierre and Michel believe it is the package they are waiting for. Their lives change completely. The movie follows the bachelors as they deal with angry gangsters, suspicious cops, and the overwhelming responsibility of fatherhood.

Cast
 Roland Giraud as Pierre
 Michel Boujenah as Michel
 André Dussollier as Jacques
 Philippine Leroy-Beaulieu as Sylvia
 Dominique Lavanant as Madame Rapons
 Marthe Villalonga as Antoinette
 Annick Alane as The Pharmacist

Sequel
A second film by Coline Serreau, with the same characters, the same actors and called 18 ans après (18 Years After) was released in 2003.

Accolades

Remakes
Trois hommes et un couffin was remade by Hollywood in English as Three Men and a Baby in 1987. This was subsequently adapted into several Indian films, including Baalache Baap Brahmachaari (1989) in Marathi, Thoovalsparsham (1990) in Malayalam which was then remade as Chinnari Muddula Papa (1990) in Telugu, Thayamma (1991) and Asathal (2001) in Tamil, Heyy Babyy (2007) in Bollywood (Hindi) and Tatlı Bela (2018) in Turkish.

See also
 List of submissions to the 58th Academy Awards for Best Foreign Language Film
 List of French submissions for the Academy Award for Best Foreign Language Film

Notes

References

External links
 Trois hommes et un couffin
 
 
 
 
 18 ans après
 
 

1985 films
1985 comedy films
French comedy films
1980s French-language films
Best Film César Award winners
Films featuring a Best Supporting Actor César Award-winning performance
Films directed by Coline Serreau
1980s French films